E4 group is a Russian engineering company, one of the biggest in the Russian Federation. With a presence in all federal districts of Russia, it has a total of 20,000 employees (up to 30,000 with affiliated firms). The current  CEO of E4 Group is Danil Nikitin.

Financial information

E4 Group was established in 2006. The main achievements of the company in 2007 were a market share of 15 percent; consolidated revenue growth of 90 percent; contract sales growth of 150 percent; and net profit growth of 260 percent.

Main projects
Projects include the N’yagan Regional Power Plant; construction of CPP-410 Krasnodar TPP;  boiler, North-west borough of Kursk – construction of CCP 125MW; and construction of a nuclear waste storage facility at Zheleznogorsk, Krasnoyarsk Krai.

See also
Mikhail Abyzov
Peter Bezukladnikov

References

External links

 Company website

Electrical engineering companies of Russia
Companies based in Moscow